Syed Sajjad Zaheer (5 November 1899 –  13 September 1973) was an Indian Urdu writer, Marxist ideologue and radical revolutionary who worked in both India and Pakistan. In the pre-independence era, he was a member of the Communist Party of India and the Progressive Writers' Movement. Upon independence and partition, he moved to the newly created Pakistan and became a founding member of the Communist Party of Pakistan.

Early life and education
Zaheer was born in Lucknow in 1905 and was the fourth son of Syed Wazir Hasan, a judge at the High Court of Judicature at Allahabad. He got his BA degree from the University of Lucknow in 1924. He then left for New College, Oxford for further studies. In his final year at Oxford he contracted tuberculosis and was sent to a sanatorium in Switzerland. On returning to England, he was influenced by the communist leader Shapurji Saklatvala and joined the Oxford Majlis. He attended the second Congress of the League against Imperialism held in Frankfurt, where he met influential leaders like Viren Chattopadhyay, Saumyendranath Tagore, N. M. Jaisoorya and Raja Pahendra Pratap. He also started the newspaper Bharat in 1930 in England. He graduated from Oxford University with a degree in BA in 1931. After finishing his studies at Oxford he travelled through Germany, Italy, Denmark and Austria on his journey back to India in 1932.

In December 1932, Zaheer along with a group of friends published his first book Angarey. The book was met with outrage from both the religious and civil authorities in British India and was subsequently banned by the government. Following the uproar due to the release of Angarey, he was sent to London by his father in March 1933 to study law at Lincoln's Inn.

Political career
In 1935, he and novelist Mulk Raj Anand went to Paris to attend the International Congress for Defense of Culture organised by André Gide. Influenced by the conference he established the Indian Progressive Writers' Association in London. The first conference of the association was held on 9 and 10 April 1936. After returning to India, he organised the first conference of the Progressive Writers’ Association in Lucknow on April 9, 1936, and started working as its general secretary. He along with Sohan Singh Josh started the first Marxist journal in Urdu, Chingari, in Saharanpur.

He became Uttar Pradesh state secretary of the Communist Party of India (CPI) as well as a member of the working committee of the Congress in 1936. He was nominated in-charge of the Delhi branch of the CPI in 1939 and was jailed for two years during the Second World War for opposing Indian participation in it. After his release in
1942, he became the editor of the CPI newspaper Qaumi Jung (People's War) and Naya Zamana (New Age) in Bombay. He also helped to organize the Indian People's Theatre Association (IPTA) and the All India Kisan Sabha.

After partition, Sajjad Zaheer along with Sibte Hasan and Mian Iftekhar-ud-Din started the Communist Party of Pakistan and was appointed Secretary General of the party. In 1951, he was arrested in the Rawalpindi Conspiracy Case along with Faiz Ahmed Faiz. He remained in jail for four years and upon release was given Indian citizenship by Jawaharlal Nehru.

While in India he continued to work in cultural activities organized by the Communist Party of India. He revived the All India Progressive Writers’ Association, became secretary of the Indian chapter of the Afro-Asian Writers' Association, and also worked as editor of Awami Daur (People's Era) and the daily Hayat

He died in 1973 while attending a literary conference in Alma Ata, Kazakhstan.

Literary career
Zaheer stated his literary career with a collection of short stories, Angarey (embers) in 1932. It had stories by Sajjad Zaheer, Ahmed Ali, Rashid Jahan and Mahmud-uz-Zafar and was banned in 1933 by the British Government of India "for hurting the religious susceptibilities of a section of the community."  This gave rise to the All-India Progressive Writers' Movement & Association of which both Sajjad Zaheer and Ahmed Ali were co-founders.  In 1935 he wrote a novel called London ki Ek Raat based on his experience of London. In 1944 a collection of letters to his wife from the prisons of Lucknow and Allahabad was published as Nuqush-e-Zindan. He also wrote Roshnai, a history-cum-memoir of the early days of the progressive movement (1956), Zikr-e-Hafiz, a critical look at the works of the legendary Persian poet Hafiz (1956), and a collection of poems in vers libre called Pighla Neelam (1964).

In addition Zaheer also served as the editor of a number of papers and magazines throughout his career including Bharat, Chingari, Qaumi Jung, Naya Zamana, Awami Daur and Hayat. He was also an avid translator, producing Urdu versions of Tagore's Gora, Voltaire's Candide and Shakespeare's Othello.

Personal life
Sajjad and his wife Razia Sajjad Zaheer had four daughters, including Naseem Bhatia, who holds a PhD in history (ancient history) from a Russian university.

Published writings
The published works of Zaheer include.
 Angarey (Nizami Press, Lucknow, 1932)
 Beemaar (Jamia Press, Delhi)
 London Ki Ek Raat لندن کی ایک رات - (Halqaye-e-adab, Lucknow, 1942)
 Urdu, Hindi, Hindustani (Kutab Publishers, Bombay, 1947)
 Letters: Naquoosh-e-Zindaan (Maktaba Shahrah, Delhi, 1951)
 Zikr-e-Hafiz زکرِخافظ (Anjuman Tarraqui-e Urdu, Aligarh, 1956)
 Roshnai روشنائی Roshnai (Maktaba Urdu, Lahore, 1956)
 Pighla Nilamپِگھلا نیلم (Nai Roshani Prakashan, Delhi, 1964)
 Meri Suno (Star Publishers, Delhi, 1967)
 Mazzamein-e-Sajjad Zaheer (published posthumously by the UP Urdu Academy, Lucknow, 1979)
 A translation of Shakespeare's Othello
 A translation of Candide
 A translation of Gora (novel written by Tagore)
 A translation of The Prophet (written by Khalil Gibran)

References

Cited sources

Further reading
 
Naresh Nadeem, 'Sajjad Zaheer: A Life of Struggle & Creativity', People's Democracy 29:51 (18 December 2005)
 Bose, Hiren K. Sajjad Zahir: The Voice of the Common Man in Chowk
 https://web.archive.org/web/20090424062127/http://jang.com.pk/thenews/feb2007-weekly/books%26people-01-02-2007/ Mughanni-I-Aatish Nafas: Sajjad Zaheer
  6 jan-1953- New York Times Sajjad Zaheer is secretary of the Communist party in Pakistan
 29 Apr 1951-New York Times, Pakistani Red Chief Seized
 Urdu & secularism by A.G. Noorani Frontline Volume 23 – Issue 17 :: 26 Aug. – 8 Sep 2006

External links
Madhu Singh's article about Sajjad Zaheer's novel London ki ek raat

1899 births
1973 deaths
Pakistani dramatists and playwrights
Urdu-language poets
Indian Marxist writers
Muhajir people
Pakistani communists
Alumni of New College, Oxford
Alumni of the University of London
University of Lucknow alumni
Indian Communist writers
Communist Party of India politicians from Uttar Pradesh
Communist Party of Pakistan politicians
People extradited to India
20th-century poets
Writers from Lucknow
Novelists from Uttar Pradesh
Poets from Uttar Pradesh
20th-century Indian novelists
20th-century Indian poets
20th-century Indian short story writers
20th-century Indian essayists
Progressive Writers' Movement
Pakistani emigrants to India